Eli Larsen (31 January 1909 – 19 July 1978) was a Danish footballer. He played in four matches for the Denmark national football team from 1933 to 1934.

References

External links
 

1909 births
1978 deaths
Danish men's footballers
Denmark international footballers
Place of birth missing
Association footballers not categorized by position